RCNN may refer to:

 Region Based Convolutional Neural Networks, a family of machine learning models for computer vision and specifically object detection.
 RCNN, the ICAO code for Tainan Airport